, also known as , was the 10th shōgun of the Ashikaga shogunate who headed the shogunate first from 1490 to 1493 and then again from 1508 to 1521 during the Muromachi period of Japan.

Yoshitane was the son of Ashikaga Yoshimi and grandson of the sixth shōgun Ashikaga Yoshinori. In his early life, he was named Yoshiki (sometimes translated as Yoshimura), and then Yoshitada — including the period of when he is first installed as shōgun; however, he changed his name to Yoshitane in 1501 in a period when he was temporarily exiled, and it is by this name that he is generally known today.

The 9th shōgun Ashikaga Yoshihisa died in 1489 on a battlefield of southern Ōmi Province. Yoshihisa left no heir; and Yoshitane became Sei-i Taishōgun a year later.

Events of Yoshitane's bakufu
Yoshitane was appointed shōgun in 1490. Hōjō Sōun gains control of Izu the following year. In 1493, Hatakeyama Yoshitoyo forces Yoshitane to abdicate. In 1493, Yoshitane lost in a power struggle against Hosokawa Masamoto and was formally replaced by the eleventh shōgun, Ashikaga Yoshizumi.

Emperor Go-Kashiwabara accedes to the throne in 1500. Ōuchi Yoshioki restores Yoshitane to the position of Sei-i Taishōgun from Yoshizumi. In 1520, a succession crisis occurred over Hosokawa Takakuni's post. When Takakuni becomes Kanrei (shogun's deputy), Yoshitane strongly opposed him and he was driven out. In 1521, Emperor Go-Kashiwabara appoints Ashikaga Yoshiharu shogun. Takakuni arranged for the replacement of Yoshitane with the twelfth shōgun, Ashikaga Yoshiharu.

Eventually, after a further power struggle with the Hosokawa clan and especially with Hosokawa Takakuni, Yoshitane was forced to withdraw to Awaji Island. He died in Awa province, on the island of Shikoku in 1523.

Yoshitane's heirs and successors
Shōgun Yoshitane adopted the son of Yoshizumi who was his cousin, Ashikaga Yoshitsuna and he designated Yoshitsuna as his heir and as his anticipated successor as shogun. However, when Yoshitane died prematurely, he was not succeeded by who he had chosen; rather, his father's newly designated heir was accepted by the shogunate as shōgun Yoshizumi.

In other words, after the death of his son, shōgun Yoshimasa adopted the son of his brother, Yoshimi. After the death of his adopted son, Yoshimasa adopted the son of another brother, Masatomo. Shogun Yoshimasa was succeeded by shōgun Yoshihisa (Yoshimasa's natural son), then by shōgun Yoshitane (Yoshimasa's first adopted son), and then by shōgun Yoshizumi (Yoshimasa's second adopted son). Yoshizumi's progeny would become shōguns in due course.

Eventually, the great-grandson of Yoshitane would be installed as a puppet shōgun for a brief period, but external power struggles would unseat him, and the Ashikaga dynasty of shōguns would end.

Family 
 Father: Ashikaga Yoshimi
 Mother: daughter of Uramatsu Shigemasa
 Wife: Seiyun'in
 Concubine: daughter of Yamana Toyoshige
 Children:
 Takewakamaru
 a daughter
 Adopted Son: Ashikaga Yoshitsuna

Eras of Yoshitane's bakufu
The years in which Yoshitane was shogun are more specifically identified by more than one era name or nengō.
 Entoku (1489–1492)
 Meiō (1492–1501)
 Bunki (1501–1504)
 Eishō (1504–1521)
 Daiei (1521–1528)

Notes

References
 Ackroyd, Joyce. (1982) Lessons from History: The Tokushi Yoron. Brisbane: University of Queensland Press.  ;  OCLC 7574544
 Titsingh, Isaac. (1834). Nihon Ōdai Ichiran; ou,  Annales des empereurs du Japon.  Paris: Royal Asiatic Society, Oriental Translation Fund of Great Britain and Ireland. OCLC 5850691.

Ashikaga shōguns
1466 births
1523 deaths
15th-century shōguns
16th-century shōguns
Yoshitane